The Rogue Valley Mall, a regional shopping mall located in Medford, Oregon, is the largest indoor shopping complex between Eugene, Oregon, and Sacramento, California. It is named for Rogue Valley in southwestern Oregon, where it is located adjacent to a Target store and Interstate 5. 

The mall houses more than one hundred stores, including Chico's, Aeropostale, American Eagle, and Bath and Body Works. The current anchor stores are Kohl's, JCPenney, Macy's, a separate Macy's store consisting of Macy's Home (on the lower level) and Macy's Backstage (upper level), and Bed Bath & Beyond. The food court features ten eateries.The total area within the mall is about 847,000 square feet.

History 

The Rogue Valley Mall was built in 1986. Early anchor stores included Mervyn's, Montgomery Wards, JCPenney, and Meier & Frank. 

In 2001, the first anchor closed when Montgomery Wards filed for Chapter 11 bankruptcy. Meier & Frank Home Store took tenancy of the vacated lower level, while Copeland Sports occupied the upper level. When Meier & Frank was bought by Federated Department Stores, the stores were rebranded as Macy's and Macy's Home, respectively. In August 2006, Copeland Sports filed for bankruptcy and was bought by Sports Authority. After Mervyn's pulled out of Oregon in 2007, the vacant space was bought by Kohl's, leaving JCPenney as the only remaining original anchor. 

Linens-N-Things operated a large store between Mervyn's and Macy's Home Store until the company went bankrupt in 2008, after which the space was occupied by Bed Bath & Beyond.

The Rogue Valley Mall is home to one of the two last remaining Sam Goody stores in the world.

On May 18, 2016, it was announced that Sports Authority would be closing all stores, including the Rogue Valley Mall location. The store closed in August 2016 and was replaced by Macy's Backstage in 2019.

See also
The Village at Medford Center
List of shopping malls in Oregon

References

External links
Rogue Valley Mall official website

Buildings and structures in Medford, Oregon
Shopping malls in Oregon
Tourist attractions in Jackson County, Oregon
1986 establishments in Oregon
Shopping malls established in 1986